Mirker Bach is a small river in Wuppertal, North Rhine-Westphalia, Germany. It is a right tributary of the Wupper in Wuppertal-Elberfeld.

See also
List of rivers of North Rhine-Westphalia

References

Rivers of North Rhine-Westphalia
Rivers of Germany